Fernand Grosjean (5 May 1924 – 19 August 2015) was a Swiss alpine skier who competed at the 1948 and at the 1952 Winter Olympics. In 1948 he finished eighth in the alpine skiing downhill competition and 16th in the combined event. Four years later he finished eleventh in the 1952 giant slalom competition. Grosjean won a silver medal in the giant slalom at the 1950 World Championships. 

Grosjean's grandson is racing driver Romain Grosjean.

References

1924 births
2015 deaths
Swiss male alpine skiers
Olympic alpine skiers of Switzerland
Alpine skiers at the 1948 Winter Olympics
Alpine skiers at the 1952 Winter Olympics
Sportspeople from Geneva